Ubiquitin carboxyl-terminal hydrolase 15 is an enzyme that in humans is encoded by the USP15 gene.

Ubiquitin is a highly conserved protein involved in the regulation of intracellular protein breakdown, cell cycle regulation, and stress response, which is released from degraded proteins by disassembly of the polyubiquitin chains. The disassembly process is mediated by ubiquitin-specific proteases (USPs).

See also
 USP1 (MIM 603478).

References

Further reading